The team vaulting event was part of the equestrian programme at the 1920 Summer Olympics.

Results

The team score was simply the sum of the best three scores for each nation in the individual vaulting competition.

References

Sources
 
 

Vaulting team